Ween is an American rock band.

Ween may also refer to:

Dean Ween, a member of rock band Ween
Gene Ween, a member of rock band Ween
WEEN, a radio station (1460 kHz) in Lafayette, Tennessee, United States
Halloween, a Western Christian celebration
The Prophecy (game), also known as Ween: The Prophecy, a video game

See also
 Wean